Neoperla is a genus of common stoneflies in the family Perlidae. There are more than 260 described species in Neoperla.

See also
 List of Neoperla species

References

Further reading

External links

 

Perlidae
Articles created by Qbugbot
Plecoptera genera